Christianity constitutes the majority religion in Cape Verde, an island nation located off the western coast of Africa. More than 85% of the population of Cape Verde is nominally Roman Catholic, according to an informal poll taken by local churches. About 5% of the population is Protestant. The largest Protestant denomination is the Church of the Nazarene. Other groups include the Seventh-day Adventist Church, the Church of Jesus Christ of Latter-day Saints (Mormons), the Assemblies of God, the Universal Church of the Kingdom of God, the New Apostolic Church and various other Pentecostal and evangelical groups.

See also
Religion in Cape Verde
Roman Catholicism in Cape Verde
The Church of Jesus Christ of Latter-day Saints in Cape Verde

References

 
Religion in Cape Verde